James Patrick Pena (born September 17, 1964) is a former left-handed pitcher in Major League Baseball who played for the San Francisco Giants in .

External links

1964 births
Living people
Baseball players from California
Cal State Dominguez Hills Toros baseball players
Major League Baseball pitchers
San Francisco Giants players
Clinton Giants players
Everett Giants players
Las Vegas Stars (baseball) players
Ottawa Lynx players
American expatriate baseball players in Canada
Salinas Spurs players
San Bernardino Spirit players
San Jose Giants players
Shreveport Captains players
Wichita Wranglers players